David G Hull (born 1944) is a Northern Irish international lawn and indoor bowler.

He won a bronze medal in the triples at the 1976 World Outdoor Bowls Championship in Johannesburg.

He was Irish bowler of the year in 1971.

References

Living people
Male lawn bowls players from Northern Ireland
1944 births